Carpooling is the sharing of automobile journeys. Carpool may also refer to:

Carpool (1983 film), a 1983 comedy film
Carpool (1996 film), a 1996 film
Carpool (web series), Robert Llewellyn's online interview series
Carpool (TV series), a TV spin-off of the web series
Carpoolers, an American comedy series